Mombasiglio is a comune (municipality) in the Province of Cuneo in the Italian region Piedmont, located about  southeast of Turin and about  east of Cuneo.

References 

Cities and towns in Piedmont
Comunità Montana Valli Mongia, Cevetta e Langa Cebana